The Rumpi Hills are an undulating mountain range with its highest peak, Mount Rata about  located between the villages of Dikome Balue and Mofako Balue, Ndian division in the Southwest region of Cameroon. The hills are situated at 4°50’N 9°07’E, cutting across four local councils, with the eastern slopes in Dikome Balue, southern slopes in Ekondo Titi, western slopes in Mundemba, and northern slopes in Toko local councils respectively.

About  of this forest forms what is known as the Rumpi Hills Forest Reserve (RHFR). Located in the equatorial forest zone of Cameroon, this area is very rich in plant biodiversity ranging from fungi to angiosperms.
   
Notwithstanding this plant biodiversity, variations do occur in the distribution of the forest ecosystems in this area. This variation in the distribution of forest ecosystems, is due to the changing agricultural landscape especially along the southern slopes of these hills. Apart from oil palm (Elaeis guineensis) owned by the agro-industrial company, Pamol Plantations PLC, and sprouting smallholder plantations, other dominant tree species do exist. These include species such as 

Other species include 

as well as non-timber forest species such as 

Additionally, many tropical montane mammal, bird, reptile and amphibian species such as 

are present.

Classification of the Rumpi Hills Forests

The forests of the Rumpi hills form part of the Cross-Sanaga-Bioko coastal forests which are a tropical humid broadleaf forest ecoregion of west–central Africa. The ecoregion includes the lowland and coastal forests of southeastern Nigeria, southwestern Cameroon and the lowlands of Bioko island, covering an estimated .

 carried-out a phytogeographic vegetation classification of this lowland forests ecoregion. These lowland forests are situated in the Lower Guinea zone of the Guineo-Congolian region of rich and endemic biodiversity composed of animal and plant species. These are mainly hygrophilous coastal evergreen rain forests which may contain other mixed moist semi-evergreen rain forests according to elevation gradient. Most common plant families (with regards to species density and distribution) are Annonaceae, Leguminosae, Euphorbiaceae and Rubiaceae.

Despite having mixed vegetation, these forests have Caesalpinioid plants as the dominant vegetation particularly along elevation gradients  elevation). Most often, the vegetation structure becomes sparse above  elevation containing mainly montane bamboo forests, shrubs and grasslands. Afromontane plant species such as Prunus Africana and Nuxia congesta are dominant.

Mount Fako and the island of Bioko are located above  and in a separate ecoregion consisting of the Mount Fako and Bioko Island montane forests. These montane forests extend inland to other highland forests of Cameroon and towards the Cross–Niger forests transition ecoregion to the west. Moving further inland to the north, east and south, these coastal forests mosaic to the Guinean forest–savannah, the Congolian forest–savannah and the Atlantic equatorial coastal forests (mainly along the River Sanaga).

It rains heavily throughout the year giving a wet climate especially with many rivers including the Cross River, River Sanaga, River Mungo, River Ndian, River Wouri and River Niger that run across the landscape. Aside rivers, the region is also home to a number of small circular craters, produced by volcanic explosions which have subsequently formed crater lakes, including Lake Barombi Mbo, Dissoni/Soden, Barombi Kotto, Benakuma, Nyos and Monoun. The ancient nature and isolation has led to a high level of endemism in these lakes where over 75% of the fish species and approximately one-third of the aquatic insects are endemic.
For instance, Lake Dissoni/Soden, a small volcanic lake covering an estimated , is located at the southeastern slopes of the Rumpi hills. The lake flows into a stream that eventually empties into the River Meme. There are only three fish species in the lake which are all endemic including Poeciliid (Procatopus lacustris) which may be related to Procatopus similis more abundant in surrounding rivers, streams and lakes. An undescribed catfish (Clarias spp) and barb (Barbus spp) as well as the atyid shrimp Caridina sodenensis are endemic species to this lake.

Majority of the region is located on the African Precambrian shield which contains principally basement rocks. Over the years, the weathering of these basement rocks has created dense layers of leached and poor red earth soils. Meanwhile, along the Atlantic Equatorial coastal forests, the continuous deposition of sand, rocks and silt has created extensive muddy banks, mangrove swamps and sandy beaches. Mount Fako and Bioko are active volcanoes and therefore their surrounding soils are rich which are from volcanic ash and pyroclastic lava and ash.

References

Sources

Mountain ranges of Cameroon
Cameroonian Highlands forests